Sudden Death Records is a Vancouver, British Columbia based record label run by Joe "Shithead" Keithley, frontman of D.O.A.

Sudden Death Records arrived in Canada's burgeoning punk scene in 1978. Keithley formed the label to release his D.O.A.'s album Disco Sucks.

It was only a part-time label until 1998, when they began to expand further into punk rock music. In keeping with the "Do It Yourself" attitude of its founder Joe Keithley, Sudden Death Records remained a friend to smaller musicians while keeping multi-national record conglomerates at bay. In doing so, they have earned themselves the respect of numerous luminaries within the music industry.

Today, Sudden Death Records remains a popular label and have branched off into other areas of music, focusing not only on punk but also ska, rock, pop and other genres.

References

Artists 

 Agriculture Club
 Geoff Berner
 Carmaig de Forest
 d.b.s.
 The Damned
 Dog Eat Dogma
 D.O.A.
 Ese
 Ford Pier
 The Honeymans
 Joe Keithley
 The Jolts
 JP5
 Karen Foster (band)
 MDC
 Modernettes

 Mojo Nixon
 Once Just
 Potbelly
 Portrait of Poverty
 Pigment Vehicle
 Pointed Sticks
 Real McKenzies
 Ripcordz
 Round Eye
 Schulz
 Sham 69
 Thor
 The Vibrators
 Vice Squad
 Young Canadians

External links 
Official site
Sudden Death Records on Myspace
Interview with Joey Keithley, Sudden Death Records  - small WORLD Podcast 2006

See also 
 List of record labels

Canadian independent record labels
Record labels established in 1978
Punk record labels
Ska record labels
Rock record labels
Pop record labels